Jonathan Page may refer to:

 Jonathan Page (cyclist) (born 1976), American cyclo-cross cyclist
 Jonathan Page (footballer) (born 1990), English footballer
 Jacko Page (Jonathan Page), British general